Nino Filastò (23 January 1938 – 29 December 2021) was an Italian lawyer and writer. He was known for defending multiple militants of the far-left in the 1980s.

Life and career
Filastò was born in Florence on 23 January 1938, where he spent the entirety of his working life. In addition to his law career, he wrote essays on the Monster of Florence and several novels. He had worked as the defender of exponents of the extreme left in the 1980s. Filastò died on 29 December 2021, at the age of 83.

Works

Novels and short stories
La proposta (1984)
La tana dell'oste (1986)
Tre giorni nella vita dell'avvocato Scalzi (1989)
Incubo di signora (1990)
La moglie egiziana (1995)
La notte delle rose nere (1997)
Forza maggiore (2002)
Il peposo di Maestro Filippo (2003)
Aringa rossa (2004)
L'alfabeto di Eden (2007)

Collections
Fuga da Eden (1993)

Essays
Pacciani innocente (1994)
Storia delle merende infami (2005)

Awards
 (1986)

References

1938 births
2021 deaths
Italian lawyers
20th-century Italian writers
21st-century Italian writers
Italian crime fiction writers
University of Florence alumni
Writers from Florence